Sunnyside Farm is a historic home and farm located near Hamilton, Loudoun County, Virginia. The original section of the house was built about 1815, and is a two-story, three-bay, vernacular Federal style dwelling. There are several frame additions built from c. 1855–1860 up through the 20th century. Also on the property are the contributing brick barn with diamond-patterned ventilation holes (c. 1813), two-story springhouse (c. 1813), a wide loafing shed, a large corncrib, and two-car garage (c. 1948).

It was listed on the National Register of Historic Places in 1994.

References

Houses on the National Register of Historic Places in Virginia
Farms on the National Register of Historic Places in Virginia
Federal architecture in Virginia
Houses completed in 1815
Houses in Loudoun County, Virginia
National Register of Historic Places in Loudoun County, Virginia
1815 establishments in Virginia